Kuteževo is a village southeast of Ilirska Bistrica in the Inner Carniola region of Slovenia.

Mass graves
Kuteževo is the site of two known mass graves from the end of the Second World War. They both contain the remains of German soldiers from the 97th Corps that were killed at the beginning of May 1945. It contains the remains of 20 prisoners of war, including a major.

Church
The small church in the settlement is dedicated to Saint Joseph and belongs to the Parish of Podgraje.

References

External links

Kuteževo on Geopedia

Populated places in the Municipality of Ilirska Bistrica